John Skipton Mulvany    (1813 – 10 May 1870) was a notable Irish architect. He was the fourth son of Thomas James Mulvany, one of the founder members, with his own brother John George, of the Royal Hibernian Academy. Most of the buildings he designed are still in daily use and are well preserved.

Career
Mulvany was apprenticed to William Deane Butler, who was responsible for many fine classical courthouses and Gothic churches. He was an admirer of James Gandon. He started by undertaking works for the Dublin and Kingstown Railway. He later cultivated people of wealth and influence in Victorian Dublin, mainly Quakers (though he himself was a Roman Catholic), thereby gaining important commissions.

His best-known work was the Broadstone (Dublin) railway station. Among the many other works designed by him were the Dún Laoghaire railway station, the Galway Railway Station and Hotel, the clubhouse for the Royal Irish Yacht Club, Mount Anville House (for William Dargan) and the Harold's Cross Episcopal church.

He died in 1870 and was buried in Mount Jerome Cemetery.

References

1813 births
1870 deaths
Architects from Dublin (city)
John Skipton Mulvany
19th-century Irish architects
Date of birth missing